Li Zhenqiang (born July 23, 1968, in Dongguan, Guangdong) is a Chinese Olympic equestrian.

Achievements

External links
http://2008teamchina.olympic.cn/index.php/personview/personsen/911

1968 births
Living people
Chinese male equestrians
Equestrians at the 2008 Summer Olympics
Olympic equestrians of China
People from Dongguan
Show jumping riders
Sportspeople from Guangdong
Equestrians at the 2002 Asian Games
Equestrians at the 2006 Asian Games
Equestrians at the 2010 Asian Games
Asian Games competitors for China
Equestrians at the 2020 Summer Olympics